Plenitude can refer to:

 Eni Plenitude - an energy firm, owned by Italian firm Eni
 Principle of plenitude - a philosophical concept
 Plenitude (magazine) - a Canadian magazine